Sisaket railway station is a railway station located in Mueang Nuea Subdistrict, Sisaket City, Sisaket. The station opened in August 1928 as part of the Northeastern Line Huai Thap Than-Sisaket section. The line continued to Ubon Ratchathani in April 1930.

Train services 
 Special Express No. 21/22 Bangkok- Ubon Ratchathani- Bangkok
 Express No. 67/68 Bangkok- Ubon Ratchathani- Bangkok
 Express No. 71/72 Bangkok- Si Sa Ket- Bangkok
 Rapid No. 135/136 Bangkok - Ubon Ratchathani- Bangkok
 Rapid No. 139/140 Bangkok- Ubon Ratchathani- Bangkok
 Rapid No. 141/142 Bangkok- Ubon Ratchathani- Bangkok
 Rapid No. 145/146 Bangkok- Ubon Ratchathani- Bangkok
 Local No. 419/420 Nakhon Ratchasima- Ubon Ratchathani- Lam Chi
 Local No. 421/422 Nakhon Ratchasima- Ubon Ratchathani- Lam Chi
 Local No.425/426 Lam Chi- Ubon Ratchathani- Nakhon Ratchasima
 Local No. 427/428 Nakhon Ratchasima- Ubon Ratchathani- Nakhon Ratchasima

References 
 
 
 

Railway stations in Thailand
Railway stations opened in 1928